Daniel George Leslie Bull (born 27 March 1986) is a British rapper and songwriter known best for his songs about video games, which he publishes on his YouTube channel.

He used to collaborate with fellow artist Dave Brown ("Boyinaband"), however, he now sometimes collaborates with another fellow artist, Greg Holgate ("The Stupendium") on music instead. He has also collaborated with fellow YouTube personalities such as Michelle 'The RPG Minx', Markiplier, and Adam Montoya. Bull's music was featured in the British press as part of attempts to save BBC Radio 6, campaign against the Digital Economy Bill, and protest in favour of filesharing. He was diagnosed with autism spectrum disorder, which is referenced in some of his songs, such as "A Portrait of the Autist".

Career
Bull has released songs on subjects such as YouTube issues, digital rights, the music industry, and gaming. Bull's actions have gained attention, specifically from the TalkTalk Group, who requested to team up with him against the Digital Economy Bill.

Bull creates gaming raps, ranging with the subgenres nerdcore, political and comedy hip hop. He was briefly partnered with Machinima; however, due to a dispute he now uploads videos independently. He also recorded the theme song for popular YouTuber Nerd³, as well as making an appearance with British gaming group, The Yogscast, with the song "Kicky Kicky Flow" (a rap about Simon Lane and Lewis Brindley), and InTheLittleWood rap (a rap about Martyn Littlewood, another Yogscast member).

Bull's album Face was released in December 2011. The 12-track album includes ten brand new songs as well as the 2010 tracks "America" and "John Lennon". The album focuses on topics such as medical recovery, war, love, Autism, alcoholism, and pride.

In 2013, Bull was featured on KSI's Football Rap Battles episode along with his friend and fellow rapper Randolph. Bull's third studio album, The Garden, was released on 31 August 2014. The album features guest appearances from Joey Gzus and long-time collaborator Beit Nun.

In 2014, Bull portrayed a depiction of Jack the Ripper in an episode of the YouTube series Epic Rap Battles of History. Bull later returned to the Epic Rap Battles in 2016 performing a depiction of Winston Churchill. 
 
On 27 March 2015, he released his fourth album, Bullmatic. It is Bull's re-imagining of Nas' classic 1994 album Illmatic: for example, Nas' "N.Y. State of Mind" is re-imagined as "U.K. State of Mind". Bull also voiced Minstrel in the 2015 indie game, Volume.

On 29 June 2015, Bull teamed up with Beit Nun, to release their long-awaited collaborative EP, Brandy Night.

On 6 December 2016, Bull collaborated with Deji (ComedyShortsGamer) and released the song “Put on Your Comedy Shorts”. The music video was uploaded to Deji’s channel titled “COMEDYSHORTSGAMER RAP !!!”  and the song was released on Dan Bull’s iTunes and Spotify. 

On 13 January 2017, Bull released his fifth album, Hip Hop Hooray. It features comedy songs, such as "Rugbuggery" and "Wiggly Willy" as well as serious life stories such as "I Hurt Myself" and "I'm Going to be a Daddy."

On 6 January 2018, Bull sang H2ODelirious' "10 MILLION SUBSCRIBER MUSIC VIDEO", which was animated by VyronixLiam. It is uploaded on H2ODelirious' channel and Dan Bull's Spotify.

On 23 March 2019, Bull released Robocopyright, a song criticizing Article 13 of the proposed Directive on Copyright in the Digital Single Market. This song also featured other YouTubers such as PewDiePie, Jacksepticeye and Roomie. The main video was released on Grandayy's YouTube channel.

Dan has collabed with Dan 'Nerdcubed' Hardcastle on a number of occasions and has performed both of Hardcastle's YouTube channel intros and outros. He also wrote and performed the theme for Demma series featuring Emma Blackery.

Discography

Studio albums 
 Safe (2009)
 Face (2011)
 Generation Gaming (2013)
 Generation Gaming II (2014)
 The Garden (2014)
 Generation Gaming III (2014)
 Generation Gaming IV (2015)
 Generation Gaming V (2015)
Generation Gaming VI (2015)
Generation Gaming VII (2015)
 Bullmatic (2015)
Generation Gaming VIII (2015) 
 Brandy Night [alongside Beit Nun] (2015)
Generation Gaming IX (2015)
 The Life of Pablo (2016)
Generation Gaming X (2016)
Generation Gaming XI (2016)
 Hip Hop Hooray (2017)
Generation Gaming XII (2017)
Generation Gaming XIII (2017) 
Generation Gaming XIV (2018)
Generation Gaming XV (2018)
Generation Gaming XVI (2018)
Generation Gaming XVII (2019)
Generation Gaming XVIII (2019)
Generation Gaming XIX (2019)
Generation Gaming XX: The Next Generation (Gaming) (2020)
Generation Gaming XXI: Rage Quit the Machine (2020)
Generation Gaming XXII: She Wants the D-Pad (2021)
Generation Gaming XXIII: Breakfast at Limmy’s (2021)
Generation Gaming XXIV: 24 Hour LAN Party People (2021)
Generation Gaming XXV: Achievement Unlocked (2022)
Generation Gaming XXVI: 25 (2022)

Videos 
 Destiny (2013)
 Dear Lily (2009)
 Doorways (2009)
 Free Gary (2009)
 Terry Bull Anti World Cup Anthem (2010)
 Generation Gaming (2009)
 Dear Andy (2010)
 Dear Mandy (2010)
 Death of ACTA (2010)
 Dear Auntie (2010)
 Wikileaks and the Need for Free Speech (2010)
 SOPA Cabana (2011)
 Dear Microsoft (2011)
 Bye Bye BPI (2012)
 A Portrait of the Autist (2013)
 Kicky Kicky Flow ft. The Yogscast (2013)
 Hey There NSA ! (2014)
 Dungeon keeper (2014)
 endermen rap 2017
 The NSA Hate This Song :)* (2014)
 Tony Benn (2014)
 Avengers Infinity Wars (Dan Bull as Doctor Strange) by NerdOut ft.Various ArtistsRobocopyright'' (2019)

References

External links 

 
 YouTube

1986 births
Artists with autism
English male rappers
Living people
Musicians from Worcestershire
Nerdcore artists
People from Bromsgrove
Political music artists
21st-century British rappers
21st-century English male musicians